The composition of art song in America began slowly in the Colonial and Federal periods, expanded greatly in the 19th century, and has become a distinguished and highly regarded addition to the classical music repertoire in the 20th and 21st centuries.

18th-century American art song 

Francis Hopkinson (1737–1791), Philadelphia native and signer of the Declaration of Independence, is usually considered the first important American song composer. His most famous song is "My Days Have been so Wondrous Free", and his Seven Songs for the Harpsichord were composed in 1788 and dedicated to George Washington.

Other 18th-century American song composers
 Peter Von Hagen (1750–1803), Dutch born
 Alexander Reinagle (1756–1809)
 Benjamin Carr (1768–1831), English born
 Gottlieb Graupner (1767–1836), German born, arrived in the U.S. in 1795
 Oliver Shaw (1779–1848)

19th-century American art song 
In the 19th century, many Americans composed songs for amateur musicians to sing at home (usually called parlor songs).  In the middle of the century Stephen Foster (1826–1864) emerged as one of the best known American composers of songs.  While many of his vocal pieces were written for minstrel shows, the simple but effective melodies of his "songs for the hearth and home" are widely popular, often mistaken for American folksongs.

By the end of the 19th century, serious American composers were travelling to European countries to study, especially with German and French composition teachers, and they gained a thorough understanding of Romantic style, including an understanding of the Lieder tradition. American songs written between 1870 and 1910 are often dismissed as sounding too "derivative", although the compositional craft shown in these works is quite high.

Other 19th-century American song composers
 John Hill Hewitt (1801–1890), composed songs about the Civil War
 Francis Boott (1813–1904)
 Daniel Decatur Emmett (1815–1904), composed the song "Dixie"
 George Frederick Root (1820–1895), composed popular Civil War songs
 Louis Moreau Gottschalk (1829–1869), piano virtuoso, also composed songs
 Philip Bliss (1838–1876)
 Alfred Humphreys Pease (1838–1882)
 Dudley Buck (1839–1909), organist and composer of sacred songs
 John Knowles Paine (1839–1906)
 Arthur Foote (1853–1937)
 George Whitefield Chadwick (1854–1931)
 Arthur Bird (1856–1923)
 George Templeton Strong (1856–1948)
 Edgar Stillman Kelley (1857–1944)
 Reginald De Koven (1859–1920), composed over 400 songs, known for "Oh promise me"
 Charles Martin Loeffler (1861–1935)
 Edward MacDowell (1861–1908)
 Carrie Jacobs-Bond (1861–1946), wrote the wedding song "I love you truly"
 Ethelbert Woodbridge Nevin (1862–1901)
 Horatio Parker (1863–1919)
 Charles Edward Ives (1874–1954)

20th-century American art song 
American composers began to break from European traditions in the early part of the 20th century. Charles Ives (1874–1954) composed songs in a variety of styles, including both traditional and experimental sounds, and self-published his important collection 114 Songs. Other publications of American song, such as those in The Wa-Wan Press editions presented works by less-known American composers.

By the end of the 20th century, several composers emerged as the leaders of American art song composition, especially Aaron Copland (1900–1990), Samuel Barber (1910–1981), and Ned Rorem (1923–2022).

Other 20th-century American art song composers
 Sidney Homer (1864–1953), husband of Louise Homer and uncle of Samuel Barber
 Jean Paul Kürsteiner (1864–1943), sacred and dramatic songs
 Harry Burleigh (1866–1949), student of Dvořák, spiritual arrangements and other songs
 Amy Beach (Mrs. H. H. A.) (1867–1944)
 Howard Brockway (1870–1951), wrote folksong arrangements with Loarine Wyman
 Arthur Farwell (1872–1952)
 Oley Speaks (1874–1948), famous for his setting of Kipling's "On the Road to Mandalay"
 Henry Clough-Leighter (1874–1956)
 Pearl G. Curran (1875–1941), 40 songs
 Frederic Ayres (1876–1926)
 John Alden Carpenter (1876–1951)
 Louis Campbell-Tipton (1877–1921)
 John Prindle Scott (1877–1932)
 Frank La Forge (1879–1953)
 Ernest Bloch  (1880–1959), Swiss-American
 Clara Edwards (1880–1974), composed over 100 songs, many in anthologies
 Charles Wakefield Cadman (1881–1946), Songs of the American Indian
 Richard Hageman (1881–1966)
 Mary Howe (1882–1964)
 Bainbridge Crist (1883–1969)
 Charles Tomlinson Griffes (1884–1920)
 Wintter Watts (1884–1962), settings of Sara Teasdale
 Deems Taylor (1885–1966)
 Henry Cowell (1887–1965)
 Hall Johnson (1887–1970) concert arrangements of spirituals
 Florence Price (1887-1953)
 David W. Guion (1892–1981), collected folk songs; composed sacred songs
 John Jacob Niles (1892–1980), arranged folk songs and composed original settings of Thomas Merton poems
 Katherine K. Davis (1892–1980)
 Douglas Moore (1893–1969) opera composer, some songs
 Ernest Charles (1895–1984) a few songs still in the repertoire
 Albert Hay Malotte (1895–1964) famous setting of "Lord's Prayer"
 Leo Sowerby (1895–1968)

 William Grant Still (1895–1978) the "Dean" of African-American composers
 Roger Sessions (1896–1985)
 Virgil Thomson (1896–1987)
 Henry Cowell (1897–1965)
 Ernst Bacon (1898–1990)
 Roy Harris (1898–1979)
 John Woods Duke (1899–1984)
 Sven Lekberg (1899–1984)
 Randall Thompson (1899–1984)
 Otto Luening (1900–1996)
 Elinor Remick Warren (1900–1991)
 Ruth Crawford Seeger (1901–1953)
 Theodore Chanler (1902–1961)
 Celius Dougherty (1902–1986)
 Vittorio Giannini (1903–1966)
 Vernon Duke (1903–1969)
 Undine Smith Moore (1904–1989)
 Marc Blitzstein (1905–1964)
 Louise Talma (1906–1996)
 Paul Creston (1906–1985)
 Ross Lee Finney (1906–1997)
 Howard Swanson (1907–1978)
 Elliott Carter (born 1908), composed a few songs, from 1938 to 1943 and the 1970s
 Sergius Kagen (1908–1964)
 Jean Berger (1909–2002)
 Charles Naginski (1909–1940)
 Paul Nordoff (1909–1977)
 Elie Siegmeister (1909–1991)
 Paul Bowles (1910–1999)
 Sam Raphling (1910–1988)
 Alan Hovhaness (1911–2000)
 Gian Carlo Menotti (1911–2007)
 John Cage (1912–1992), songs include "The Wonderful Widow of 18 Springs"
 Hugo Weisgall (1912–1997)
 Margaret Bonds (1913–1972)
 Norman Dello Joio (1913–2008)
 John Edmunds (1913–1986)
 Vivian Fine (1913–2000)
 Gardner Read (1913–2005)
 Irving Fine (1914–1962)
 David Diamond (1915–2005)
 George Perle (1915–2009)
 Vincent Persichetti  (1915–1987)
 Gordon Binkerd (1916–2003)
 Leonard Bernstein (1918–1990)
 George Rochberg (1918–2005)
 John La Montaine (1920–2013)
 Jack Beeson (1921–2010)
 Seymour Barab (1921–2014)
 William Bergsma (1921–1994)
 Ernest Gold (1921–1999) film music, cycle Songs of Love and Parting
 Lloyd Pfautsch (1921–2003) much sacred music, some songs
 Lukas Foss (1922–2009)
 Robert Kreutz (1922–1996)
 Richard Owen (1922–2015) lawyer, judge, and composer
 Jean Eichelberger Ivey (1923–2010)
 Daniel Pinkham (1923–2006)
 Lee Hoiby (1926–2011)
 Dominick Argento (1927–2019)
 Richard Hundley (1931–2018)
 H. Leslie Adams (born 1932)
 Luigi Zaninelli (born 1932)
 Kenneth Benshoof (born 1933)

21st-century American art song 
American art song composition continues to be lively and strong in the early 21st century.  Commissions from well-known singers have added a number of new works to the repertoire, and composers such as Tom Cipullo, Ricky Ian Gordon, Daron Hagen, Jake Heggie, Lori Laitman and John Musto are establishing themselves as the current generation of leading American art song composers.

Other 21st-century American art song composers
 André Previn (1929–2019)
 Robert Baksa (born 1938)
 William Bolcom (born 1938)
 John Corigliano (born 1938)
 John Harbison (born 1938)
 Thomas Pasatieri (born 1945)
 Judith Lang Zaimont (born 1945)
 Stephen Paulus (1949–2014)
 Libby Larsen (born 1950)
 Daniel Brewbaker (born 1951)
 Scott Wheeler (born 1952)
 Judith Cloud (born 1954)
 Robert Beaser (born 1954)
David Garner (born 1954)
David Conte (born 1955)
 Lori Laitman (born 1955)
 Larry Alan Smith (born 1955)
 Richard Danielpour (born 1956)
 James Primosch (born 1956)
 Juliana Hall (born 1958)
 Aaron Kernis (born 1960)
 Ben Moore (born 1960)
 Scott Gendel (born 1977)
 Sarah Hutchings (born 1984)
 Alex Weiser (born 1989)

See also
English art song

References

External links
The LiederNet Archive
American Art Song Page
Essential American Recordings Survey 
Hampsong Foundation
Library of Congress Introduction to American Art Song
The African-American Art Song Alliance
PBS "I Hear America Singing" composer profiles
Song of America

American music history
American styles of music
Art songs